KSMG (105.3 FM, "Magic 105.3") is a Hot AC formatted radio station serving the San Antonio area, licensed to Seguin. The Cox Media Group outlet operates at 105.3 MHz with an ERP of 97.5 kW from a transmitter near Elmendorf in far northwestern Wilson County. Its studios are located in northwest San Antonio near the South Texas Medical Center complex.

History
Seguin Broadcasting Company, Inc., owners of KWED (1580 AM), filed a construction permit for a new radio station to broadcast on 105.3 MHz on September 15, 1969, which was granted by the FCC on December 31. The station began broadcasting September 9, 1970; like the AM station, it aired a middle of the road format, and it simulcast the AM station 40 percent of the time.

FCC regulatory changes made in 1984 would have required KWED-FM to increase its power, which would have given the station a significant signal over San Antonio. Seguin Broadcasting Company, headed by Stan McKenzie, had no desire to run a major-market station. In late 1984, McKenzie reached a deal to sell KWED to American Media, Inc., which owned stations in Baltimore and on Long Island. The divestiture of the FM prompted programming changes at the AM, including the end of afternoon Spanish-language shows that had aired since 1948.

In March 1985, after the signal upgrade was completed, American Media's programming debuted and the station relaunched as "Magic 105", a gold-based adult contemporary format. In its first ratings book, KSMG cracked the top five in San Antonio. The station went full into the oldies format in 1988 upon its acquisition by The Rusk Corporation. Jacor filed to buy the station in 1989 in a deal that ultimately never closed; it was part of a package deal with KTRH and KLOL in Houston, and the company was forced to take the San Antonio-market station in order to purchase the Houston outlets. Rusk consolidated its position in the classic hits format in San Antonio when it entered into a local marketing agreement to take over the operations of a struggling KISS-FM in November 1991; KISS simulcasted KSMG until it returned to its heritage rock format on December 31, 1991.

At the end of 1995, KSMG shifted to hot adult contemporary. In 1997, Cox Radio acquired KSMG; KISS-FM, which Rusk had bought outright; and KLUP (930 AM) from Rusk in a $30 million transaction. The station later shifted to mainstream adult contemporary; in 2014, as the station shifted back toward hot AC, Mediabase added KSMG to its Hot AC panel.

References

External links

Hot adult contemporary radio stations in the United States
Cox Media Group
SMG
Radio stations established in 1970
1970 establishments in Texas